McAfee Change Control is a commercial file integrity monitoring solution for Windows- and Linux-based systems developed by McAfee.

External links
McAfee
PCI Security Standards Council

Windows security software
Linux security software
Intrusion detection systems
Computer network security
Cryptographic software